This is a list of sports television series. This list is compiled of sports television shows from different countries around the world.

#
1st and 10
1st & Ten (HBO, 1984–1991)
2 Minute Drill (ESPN, 2000–2001)
24/7 (HBO, 2007–present)
30 for 30

A
Adventures Abroad
AFL 360 (Fox Sports (Australia) from 2010 to 2011, and Fox Footy from 2012–present)
Against the Head (RTÉ Two, 2003–present)
The American Athlete
American Sports Cavalcade (TNN, 1983–1995)
Arliss (HBO, 1996–2002)
Around the Horn (ESPN, 2002–present)
Athlete 360
Australia's Greatest Athlete (Aired on Nine Network in 2009, then on Seven Network from 2010 to 2011)
The Average Guys TV Show

B
Back in the Game
The Back Page (Fox Sports (Australia), 1997–present)
The Bad News Bears
Ball Boys (ABC, 2012)
Ball Four
Baseball Tonight (ESPN, 1990–present)
Baseball's Golden Age
Battle of the Gridiron Stars
Bay City Blues
The Best and Worst of Tred Barta (NBCSN, 2004–present)
The Best Damn Sports Show Period (Fox Sports Net, 2001–2009)
The Big Fight Live (ITV, 1984–1995, 2005–2010, 2015-present)
The Blitz
Boots N' All (Sky Sports)
Bound for Glory
Bowhunter TV
Boxing After Dark (HBO, 1996–present)
The Bronx is Burning (ESPN, 2007)

C
CBS Sports Spectacular (1960–present)
Celebrity Boxing (FOX, 2002)
CFL on CBC (CBC Television, 1952–2007)
CFL on CTV (CTV, 1962–1986)
Championship Goals (ITV, 2004–2009)
Championship Week
Cheap Seats (ESPN Classic, 2004–2006)
Classic Now (ESPN Classic, 2005–2006)
Clubhouse
Coach (ABC, 1989–1997)
Cold Pizza (ESPN2, 2003–2007)
College Basketball on CBS (CBS, 1981–present)
College Football Live
College GameDay (basketball) (ESPN, 2005–present)
College GameDay (football) (ESPN, 1987–present)
College Scoreboard
The Contender
Costas Now (HBO, 2005–2009)
Cricket on Five (Channel 5, 2006–present)

D
The Daily Habit
Dallas Cowboys Cheerleaders: Making the Team (CMT, 2006–present)
Dangerous Game
Destination Tennis

E
E:60 (ESPN2, 2007–present)
Eastbound & Down (HBO, 2009–2010, 2012–2013)
Eircom League Weekly (TV3, 2002–2007)
ESPN Classic Remembers
ESPN College Football Saturday Primetime
ESPN College Football Thursday Primetime
ESPN Full Circle
ESPN National Hockey Night (ESPN, 1992–2004)
ESPN Sunday Night Football (ESPN, 1987–2006)
ESPN2 College Football Friday Primetime
ESPN2 College Football Saturday Primetime
ESPN2 Garage
ESPNews Gametime
ESPNU Coaches Spotlight
ESPNU College Basketball
ESPNU College Football
ESPNU Inside the Polls
ESPNU Recruiting Insider
Estadio Uno (Televisión Nacional Uruguay, 1970–2017)
Extreme Dodgeball (Game Show Network, 2004–2005)

F
Fanarchy
The Fantasy Show
Fight Girls (Oxygen Network)
Final Score (BBC, 1958–present)
Final Score (Fox Sports Net, 2006–2011)
First Take (ESPN2, 2007–present)
Football League Extra (ITV, 1994–2004)
The Football League Show (BBC One, 2009–present)
A Football Life (NFL Network, 2011–present)
Football Night in America (NBC, 2006–present)
Footballers' Wives (ITV, 2002–2006)
The Footy Show (Nine Network, 1994–present)
Fore Inventors Only (Golf Channel)
Fox Football Fone-in (Fox Soccer Channel, 2007–2010)
Fox NFL Kickoff
Fox NFL Sunday (FOX, 1994–present)
Fox Sports Live (Fox Sports 1, 2013–2017)
Friday Night Fights (ESPN2, 1998–2015)
Friday Night Lights (NBC & 101 Network, 2006–2011)
The Full Motty

G
The Game
Game of Arms
Games People Play
Garbage Time with Katie Nolan (Fox Sports 1, 2015–2017)
The George Michael Sports Machine (Syndication, 1984–2007)
Gillette Cavalcade of Sports (NBC, 1946–1960)
Goals on Sunday (Sky Sports)
Golf at Altitude (Altitude Sports and Entertainment, 2005–present)
Grand Prix (BBC2, 1978–1996)
Greatest Sports Legends

H
H2 (1995–1996)
H2: Kimi to Ita Hibi (2005)
Hank Parker's Outdoor Magazine (Syndication, 1985–present)
Hard Knocks (HBO: First from 2001 to 2002, and again from 2007–present)
Hardball
Hardwood Classics (NBA TV, 1999–present)
Harlem Globetrotters
HBO World Championship Boxing (HBO, 1973–present)
The Herd with Colin Cowherd (ESPNU, 2008-2011 & 2012–2015, ESPNews, 2011–2012, Fox Sports 1, 2015-present)
Highly Questionable (ESPN2, 2011–present)
His & Hers (ESPN2, 2011–2017)
Hockey Central (Sportsnet)
Hockey Night in Canada (CBC Television, 1952–2014)
Hockey Night Live!
Homecoming with Rick Reilly
The Hoop Life
The Hot List (ESPNEWS, 2004–2009)
Howie Meeker's Hockey School (CBC, 1973–1977)
Hunter's Handbook TV
Hunting 201

I
I, Max (Fox Sports Net, 2004–2005)
Inside Sport (BBC One, 2007–present)
Inside the NBA (TNT, 1988–present)
Inside the NFL (HBO from 1977 to 2008, Showtime from 2008–present, & NFL Network from 2014–present)

J
The Jim Coleman Show (CBC Television, 1959–1960)
Jim Rome is Burning (ESPN, 2003–2011, ESPN2, 2011–2012)
The Jump (Channel 4, 2014–present)

K
Keijo!!!!!!!! (Tokyo MX, AT-X, BS11, 2016)
Kick Start (BBC One, 1979–1988)
Knight School (ESPN, 2006)
Know Your Sport (RTÉ, 1987–1998)

L
The Last Leg (Channel 4, 2012–present)
A League of Their Own (CBS, 1993)
A League of Their Own (game show) (Sky 1, 2010–present)
The League (FX from 2009 to 2012, and FXX from 2013–present)
The Life (ESPN)
Lights Out

M
Major League Baseball on ABC (ABC: First run: 1953–1965. Second run: 1976–1989. Third run: 1994–1995)
Major League Baseball on CBS (CBS: First run: 1955–1965. Second run: 1990–1993)
Major League Baseball on Fox (FOX, 1996–present)
Major League Baseball on NBC (NBC: First run: 1947–1989. Second run: 1994–2000)
Major League Baseball on TBS (TBS, 2007–present)
Major League Baseball on TSN (TSN, 1984–present)
Match of the Day (BBC Two from 1964 to 1965, BBC One from 1965–present)
Match of the Day (U.S. TV series) (NBCSN, 2013–present)
Mike & Mike
Missing Link
MLB Tonight (MLB Network, 2009–present)
MLB Whiparound (Fox Sports 1, 2014–present)
Monday Night Football (Aired on ABC from 1970 to 2005, and then on ESPN from 2006–present)
Monday Night Soccer (RTÉ Two, 2008–2013)
MTV Rock N' Jock
My Boys (TBS, 2006–2010)
MVP (2008)

N
NASCAR Countdown
NASCAR Now (ESPN2, 2007–2014)
NASCAR on Fox (FOX, 2001–present)
NASCAR on TBS (TBS, 1983–2000)
NASCAR Outdoors
NASCAR RaceDay (Fox Sports 1, 2013–present)
NASCAR Race Hub (Fox Sports 1, 2013–present)
NASCAR Victory Lane (Fox Sports 1, 2013–present)
National Sports Report (Fox Sports Net, 1996–2002)
NBA Access with Ahmad Rashad
NBA Coast to Coast
NBA Fastbreak
NBA Inside Stuff (NBC, 1990–2002. ABC, 2002–2005. NBA TV, 2013-present)
NBA on ABC (ABC: First run: 1965–1973. Second run: 2002-present)
NBA on CBS (CBS, 1973–1990)
NBA on ESPN (ESPN: First run: 1982–1984. Second run: 2002-present)
NBA on NBC (NBC: First run: 1954–1962. Second run: 1990–2002)
NBA on TBS (TBS, 1984–2002)
NBA on TNT (TNT, 1988–present)
NBA Shootaround (ESPN, 2002–present)
NBC Sunday Night Football (NBC, 2006–present)
NFL AM
NFL Insiders
NFL Live (First on ESPN2 from 1998 to 2002, and then on ESPN from 2002–present)
NFL on CBS (CBS: First run: 1956–1994. Second run: 1998-present)
NFL on FOX (FOX, 1994–present)
NFL on NBC (NBC: First run: 1939–1998. Later returned in 2006 with NBC Sunday Night Football)
The NFL Today (CBS: First run: 1975–1994. Second run: 1998-present)
NFL Top 10 (NFL Network, 2007–present)
NFL Top 100 (NFL Network, 2011–present)
NFL Total Access (NFL Network, 2003–present)
NHL 2Night (ESPN2, 1995–2004)
NHL on ABC (ABC: First from 1993 to 1994, and then from 2000 to 2004)
NHL on CTV 
NHL on Fox (FOX, 1995–1999)
NHL on NBC (NBC, 2006–present)
NHL on RKO General
NHL on Sportsnet
NHL on Versus (Versus, 2005–2011)
NHL Tonight

O
Off the Record with Michael Landsberg (TSN, 1997–present)
The Official BCS Ratings Show
Oil Change (TSN from 2010 to 2011, and Sportsnet from 2011 to 2014)
Olbermann (ESPN2, 2013–present)
Olympic Treasures
On the Ball (ITV: First run: 1965–1985. Second run: 1998–2004)
On the Bench
On the Couch (Fox Footy Channel from 2002 to 2006, Fox Sports (Australia) from 2007 to 2011, and Fox Footy from 2012–present)
On the Record with Bob Costas (HBO, 2001–2004)
Outside the Lines (ESPN, 1990–present)

P
Pardon the Interruption (ESPN, 2001–present)
PGA Tour on USA
Phenom
Pinks
Pitch (FOX, 2016)
Playmakers (ESPN, 2003)
The Premiership (ITV Sport, 2001–2004)
Prime Time Sports (A sports radio show that has been simulcast on Rogers Sportsnet from 2004–present)
Pro Football Now
Pros vs. Joes (Spike, 2006–2010)
Put Up Your Dukes
Power Rangers Turbo (1997)
Power Play (1998-2000)

Q
A Question of Sport (BBC One, 1968–present)

R
Race for the Pennant
Radical Outdoor Challenge
Real Sports with Bryant Gumbel (HBO, 1995–present)
República Deportiva (Univision, 1999–present)
Rory and Paddy's Great British Adventure (Five, 2008 & 2010)

S
Saint and Greavsie (ITV, 1985–1992)
Saturday Night at the Garden (DuMont, 1950–1951)
Saturday Night Footy (Network Ten, 2002–2011, One, 2009–2011, Seven Network, 2012-present & 7mate, 2012–present)
Scotsport (STV, 1957–2008)
Season of Champions on TSN (TSN)
SEC Nation
SEC Network Football
Shaqtin' a Fool
ShoBox: The New Generation (Showtime, 2001–present)
The Show to Be Named Later...
Showtime Championship Boxing (Showtime, 1986–present)
Skip and Shannon: Undisputed (Fox Sports 1, 2016–present)
Soccer Academy
Soccer Central (Sportsnet, 2012–present)
Soccer Night (ITV, 1990s-2008)
Soccer Republic (RTÉ Two, 2014–present)
Speak for Yourself with Cowherd & Whitlock (Fox Sports 1, 2016–present)
Sport Nation (BBC Two Scotland, 2009–present)
Sport Science
Sports Cartoons
Sports Challenge (Syndication, 1971–1979)
Sports Geniuses (Fox Sports Net, 2000)
Sports Night (ABC, 1998–2000)
Sports on Tap
Sports Page (1977-2005)
The Sports Reporters (ESPN, 1988–present)
Sports Soup
Sports Stars of Tomorrow (Syndication, 2005–present)
Sports Tonight (CNN from 1980 to 2001, and CNN/SI from 1996 to 2002)
SportsCenter (ESPN, 1979–present)
SportsCentre (TSN, 1984–present)
SportsCentury (ESPN, 1999–2007)
SportsDesk (NESN, 1991–2010)
SportsNation (ESPN2, 2009–present)
Sportsworld (Seven Network, 1990–2006)
Sportsworld (U.S. TV series) (NBC, 1978–1992)
The Sportswriters on TV (1985-2000)
The Standard Snowboard Show
Stump the Schwab (ESPN2 from 2004 to 2005, and ESPN Classic in 2006)
Summer House
SummerBall
Sunday NFL Countdown (ESPN, 1985–present)
Sunday Night Baseball (ESPN, 1990–present)
Super Bikes!

T
Talk2 (ESPN2, 1993–1998)
That Was The Team That Was (BBC One Scotland, 2006–2007)
That's Hockey (TSN, 1995–present)
They Think It's All Over (BBC One, 1995–2006)
This Week in Baseball (First-run syndication, 1977–1998, FOX, 2000–2011)
Thrillbillies (Fuel TV, 2009–present)
Thursday Night Baseball (MLB Network, 2009–present)
Thursday Night Football
The Tim McCarver Show (Syndication, 2000–present)
The Top 5 Reasons You Can't Blame... (ESPN2 & ESPN Classic, 2005–2007)
Track & Field Weekly (Olympic Channel, 2018–present)
TSN Hockey (TSN: First from 1987 to 1998, and again from 2002 to 2014)

U
UFC Primetime (Spike TV, 2009–2011, FX, 2012-present)
UFC Tonight (Fox Sports 1, 2013–present)
UFC Ultimate Insider (Fuel TV, 2012–present)
Under the Moon (Channel 4, 1996–1998)
Unique Whips (Speed Channel, 2005–2008)
Unscripted with Chris Connelly (ESPN, 2001–2002)
Untold: The Greatest Sports Stories Never Told (Spike TV, 2004–2005)
Up Close (First on USA in 1981, and later on ESPN from 1982 to 2001)
USA Tuesday Night Fights (USA, 1982–1998)
USL Breakaways

V
Vintage NBA (ESPN Classic, 1999–2003)

W
The Way It Was (PBS, 1974–1978)
Wayne Rooney's Street Striker (Sky1, 2008–2010)
WCW Monday Nitro (TNT, 1995–2001)
WCW Thunder (TBS, 1998–2001)
Western Extreme
Whacked Out Sports
The White Shadow (CBS, 1978–1981)
Who's No. 1? (ESPN, 2004)
A Whole New Ballgame
Wide World of Sports (Australian TV series) (Nine Network: First from 1981 to 1999, then again from 2008–present)
Wide World of Sports (U.S. TV series) (ABC, 1961–1998)
Wild World of Spike (Spike, 2007)
Wimp 2 Warrior
World of Sport (ITV, 1965–1985)
WWE Free for All
WWE Raw (USA from 1993 to 2000, Spike TV from 2000 to 2005, then again on USA from 2005–present)
WWE Smackdown

X
Xcorps Action Sport TV

Y
Yuri on Ice (2016)

References

Sports